Lhunze may refer to:

Lhünzê County, county in Tibet
Lhünzê Town, village in Tibet